Harold Kefauver Keller (July 7, 1927 – June 5, 2012) was an American professional baseball player and executive who served as the fourth general manager in the history of the Seattle Mariners of Major League Baseball (1984–85). Born on a farm in Middletown, Maryland, he graduated from the University of Maryland with a degree in economics and served in the United States Army during World War II. Keller's older brother, Charlie, was an All-Star left fielder with the New York Yankees.

Baseball career
During an eight-season pro playing career, which began in 1948, Keller appeared as a catcher in 25 MLB games for the Washington Senators between 1949 and 1952. His 11 big-league hits included five doubles and one home run, a two-run shot hit at Fenway Park off James Atkins of the Boston Red Sox on September 29, 1950.

After managing in the Senators' farm system during the late 1950s, he scouted for them until the franchise moved to Minneapolis–Saint Paul as the Minnesota Twins after the 1960 season.

After 1978, Keller left the Rangers to become farm system and scouting director of the Seattle Mariners (1979–83). During his two decades as farm and scouting director with the Senators/Rangers and the Mariners, he signed and developed players such as Phil Bradley, Jeff Burroughs, Joe Coleman, Mike Hargrove, Mark Langston, Bill Madlock, Jim Sundberg and Bill Swift.

Keller then served as the Mariners' vice president, baseball operations, and general manager from October 1983 to July 12, 1985, when he resigned. The Mariners went 115–132 (.466) during his 1-year term as general manager, while incorporating Langston, Swift, Alvin Davis and Jim Presley into their lineup. He later scouted for the Detroit Tigers and Anaheim Angels.

Hal Keller died in his sleep at home in Sequim, Washington, aged 84. He had been battling diabetes and esophageal cancer.

References

External links

Hal Keller at Baseball America: Baseball Executives

1927 births
2012 deaths
Anaheim Angels scouts
Augusta Tigers players
Baseball executives
Baseball players from Maryland
California Angels scouts
Charlotte Hornets (baseball) players
Chattanooga Lookouts players
Deaths from cancer in Washington (state)
Deaths from diabetes
Deaths from esophageal cancer
Detroit Tigers scouts
Hagerstown Owls players
Kansas City Blues (baseball) players
Major League Baseball catchers
Major League Baseball farm directors
Major League Baseball general managers
Maryland Terrapins baseball players
Memphis Chickasaws players
Minnesota Twins scouts
People from Middletown, Maryland
Seattle Mariners executives
Texas Rangers executives
Toronto Maple Leafs (International League) players
United States Army personnel of World War II
Washington Senators (1901–1960) players
Washington Senators (1961–1971) executives